WHCT-LD, virtual and UHF digital channel 35, is a low-powered MeTV owned-and-operated television station dually licensed to Hartford and New Haven, Connecticut, United States. The station is owned by Chicago-based Weigel Broadcasting. WHCT-LD's transmitter is located on Rattlesnake Mountain in Farmington.

History
The WHCT call letters, which were once used on channel 18 (now Univision affiliate WUVN), were adopted by the station in August 2001. Ten years after the station signed on, from 1991 to 2001, its call letters were W69CL, with a brief change to W32BV during a failed attempt to move it to channel 32 from 1997 to 1998.

In December 2019, Weigel Broadcasting agreed to purchase WHCT-LD from Venture Technologies Group for $1.5 million. The sale was completed on September 30, 2020, and Weigel placed five of their networks on WHCT-LD immediately, replacing the Jewelry Television affiliation.

Weigel had not had an affiliate in the area for any of their networks since WZME (channel 43, mainly serving the New York market from Bridgeport) ended their affiliation with MeTV in 2015. WZME would eventually be affiliated with MeTV Plus on September 27, 2021, and Story Television upon its launch on March 28, 2022.

Subchannels
The station's digital signal is multiplexed:

References

External links

Low-power television stations in the United States
HCT-LD
MeTV affiliates
Heroes & Icons affiliates
Start TV affiliates
Movies! affiliates
Decades (TV network) affiliates
OnTV4U affiliates
Television channels and stations established in 1991
1991 establishments in Connecticut
Weigel Broadcasting